Perdido por perdido is an Argentine 1993 thriller directed by Alberto Lecchi and starring Ricardo Darín, Enrique Pinti and Carolina Papaleo.

Synopsis 
Vidal (Darín) is about to be bankrupt, so he sets up a fake car robbery with a small-time mobster to collect insurance and split the money. But his perfect plan becomes entangled by his increasingly dangerous ties to the mob and the meddling of a rogue insurance investigator (Pinti), who eventually strikes a deal with Vidal and decides to team up with him and his wife (Papaleo) to bring down the mob and expose the corruption that links a high-ranking executive to the mafia.

External links

1993 films
Argentine thriller films
1990s Spanish-language films
Films directed by Alberto Lecchi
1990s Argentine films